Antonius Stanislaus Nicolaas Ludovicus Dupuis (18 February 1877, Antwerp – 13 October 1937, The Hague) was a Dutch sculptor and medallist of Belgian origin.

Dupuis was a lecturer at the Koninklijke Academie van Beeldende Kunsten in The Hague. Among his works are a picture of Johannes Zwijsen in the St. Dionysius Church in Tilburg, a statue of Petrus Canisius in the Hunnerpark te Nijmegen, a bust of mgr. His work was part of the art competitions at the 1928 Summer Olympics and the 1932 Summer Olympics.

Works in public spaces
 Bust of Petrus J.H. Cuypers (1910), Rijksmuseum Amsterdam
 Bust of Victor de Stuers (1914), Rijksmuseum Amsterdam
 Bbust of Jozef Israëls (19..), Rijksmuseum Amsterdam
 William III (1921), Kasteelplein, Breda
 Queen Emma (1936), in the rose garden of Jozef Israel Square.  This monument is by Dupuis in collaboration with the architect Co Brandes. The stone monument is in French Vaurion limestone.  The statue was damaged by graffiti and cleaning and was replaced in 2001 by a cast copy, The Hague
 Bench in the Clingendael estate, monument in 1932 donated by the city of The Hague
 Johan and Cornelis de Witt (1918), Visbrug, Dordrecht
 Bust of Alexander Frederik de Savornin Lohman (1924), Rijksuniversiteit Groningen, Groningen
 Heilig Hartbeeld (1924), Tempsplein, Heerlen
 Bust of Rembrandt (1906), Wittesingel, Leiden
 H. Petrus Canisius (1927),  Nijmegen
 Bust of Nolens (19..), (Catholic Documentation Centre), Nijmegen
 statue of Johannes Zwijsen (1933), Willemsplein, Tilburg
 Bust of the burgemeister Bernardus Reiger (1909), in the Maliebaan/Maliesingel park, Utrecht
 Bas relief of Hendrik Adriaan van Beuningen (19..), public library Oudegracht, Utrecht
 Prof. Franciscus Cornelis Donders (1921), Janskerkhof, Utrecht
 Borstbeeld Petrus Stuyvesant (1911), St. Mark's Church-in-the-Bowery on Second Avenue, New York City
 Statue of William the Silent (1920) erected on Rutgers Universitys Voorhees Mall in 1928, New Brunswick, New Jersey

Gallery

See also
 List of Dutch sculptors

References

 This article was translated from the Dutch Wikipedia article Toon Dupuis.

External links
 

Dutch medallists
1877 births
1937 deaths
Dutch male sculptors
Artists from Antwerp
20th-century Dutch sculptors
Olympic competitors in art competitions
20th-century Dutch male artists